= Coda wave interferometry =

Utrasound technique

Coda wave interferometry is an ultrasound technique for detection of weak and local changes in complex inhomogeneous media. Sound waves that travel through a medium are scattered multiple times by heterogeneities in the medium, or boundaries in a sample of limited size, and generate slowly decaying waves, called coda waves.

Despite their noisy and chaotic appearance, coda waves are highly repeatable such that if no change occurs in the medium over time, the waveforms are identical. If a change occurs, such as a crack in the medium, the change in the multiple scattered waves will result in an observable change in the coda waves.

== Snieder's model of Coda Wave ==
In the article Roel Snieder described the theory of the coda wave interferometry. He assumed that fields are considered as a sum of trajectories:

$u_i(t) = \sum_{tr}^{ } S_{tr} (t)$

Considering that $\lambda \ll l_e$ where $l_e$ is the elastic mean free path, Snieder demonstrated that medium perturbations acted as a propagation time change:

$u_p(t) = \sum_{tr}^{ } S_{tr}(t - \tau_{tr})$

== Normalised correlation coefficient ==
In order to estimate a level of perturbations, we used the correlation coefficient. We consider a time window centered at time t and of 2T width. The correlation coefficient is given by:

$CC(\delta t) = \frac{\int_{t-T}^{t+T} u_i(t')u_p(t'+\delta t)dt'}{\sqrt{\int_{t-T}^{t+T} u_i^2(t')dt' \int_{t-T}^{t+T}u_p^2(t')dt'}}, CC \in [-1, 1]$

where $u_i$ is the reference measurement and $u_p$ is the perturbed measurement.

== Velocity perturbation ==
The unperturbed travel time is given by

$t_{tr} = \int_{tr}^{}\frac{1}{\upsilon}ds ,$

where $\upsilon$ is the coda wave velocity.

The perturbed travel time is

$t_{tr} + \tau_{tr} = \int_{tr}^{}\frac{1}{\upsilon + \delta \upsilon}ds = \int_{tr}^{}\frac{1}{\upsilon}\frac{1}{1 + \frac{\delta \upsilon}{\upsilon}}ds \simeq \int_{tr}^{}\frac{1}{\upsilon}(1 - \frac{\delta \upsilon}{\upsilon})ds = \int_{tr}^{}\frac{1}{\upsilon}ds - \int_{tr}^{}\frac{\delta \upsilon}{\upsilon^2}ds,$

where $\delta \upsilon \ll \upsilon$ is the velocity perturbation.

Thus $\tau_{tr} = - \int_{tr}^{}\frac{\delta \upsilon}{\upsilon^2}ds$ . If the relative velocity perturbation is assumed constant, then

$\tau_{tr} = - (\frac{\delta \upsilon}{\upsilon}t_{tr}) \simeq - \frac{\delta \upsilon}{\upsilon}t,$

where t is the center time of the employed time window.

Thus, the travel time perturbation depends on the arrival time of the coda wave, but not of the particular path followed.
